Giovanni Bruni ( - 1571) was an Albanian Bishop of Bar from Ulcinj part of the Bruni family and related to Antonio Bruni and Gasparo Bruni. Giovanni Bruni confronted Ottoman rule and the Greek Orthodox Church working hard for the Catholic cause. In 1551 he became the bishop of Bar. In 1553, the Pope wrote to Giovanni in Bar and to the bishops of Ulcinj asking them to investigate the proposed grant of land by the Abbey f St. Nicholas to Antonio Bruti, whom had asked for the papal confirmation to secure the family heir. In 1558 Giovanni became the archbishop of Ulcinj. Giovanni Bruni was a Jesuit and archbishop who took a lead role in 1563 at the Council of Trent, which launched the Catholic Counter-Reformation. Giovanni was enslaved by the Ottomans when the city fell in 1571 and was later killed by the Spanish as they cut him down despite yelling ”I am Christian, I am a bishop”. It is believed that Giovannis brother, Antonio Bruni, was only 100 yards away.

References 

Year of birth uncertain
1571 deaths
16th-century Albanian Roman Catholic bishops